The Lingua Franca Core (LFC) is a selection of pronunciation features of the English language recommended as a basis in teaching of English as a lingua franca. It was proposed by linguist Jennifer Jenkins in her 2000 book The Phonology of English as an International Language. Jenkins derived the LFC from features found to be crucial in non-native speakers' understanding of each other, and advocated that teachers focus on those features and regard deviations from other native features not as errors but as acceptable variations. The proposal sparked a debate among linguists and pedagogists, while Jenkins contended that much of the criticism was based on misinterpretations of her proposal.

Features
Jenkins summarised the Lingua Franca Core as follows:

  may be substituted by other consonants.
 Syllable-final  is always produced (rhotic).
 Word-initial  are aspirated.
 Pre-fortis clipping is present, so that the vowel in kit is shorter than that in kid.
 Omission of consonants in clusters is allowed word-medially and -finally (but not initially).
 Vowel epenthesis between consonants is allowed.
 The contrast between checked and free vowels is maintained quantitatively, not necessarily qualitatively, so that the vowel in heat is longer than that in hit but need not differ in quality.
 Non-native vowel qualities are acceptable as long as they are consistent, except for the  vowel.
 Contrastive stress is present.

Jenkins also identified non-core features, which did not hinder intelligibility among non-native speakers and were therefore deemed non-essential in teaching:

 Finer vowel quality
 Weak forms of function words (which can rather have an adverse effect on intelligibility)
 Some features of connected speech, such as the place assimilation of a word-final plosive
 Pitch movement signalling attitude or grammatical meaning
 Lexical stress
 Stress-timed rhythm

Jenkins stressed that the LFC should be taught in parallel with "accommodation skills" to facilitate communication with speakers with different language backgrounds.

The features were based on 40 tokens of misunderstanding between speakers from Japan and Switzerland, and were intended as subject to further empirical testing and fine-tuning. Taking into account these perceived shortcomings of the LFC, recommendations similar to the LFC but intended for learners from specific linguistic or geographical backgrounds have been produced.

Application
 is considered the first textbook for language teachers to incorporate the Lingua Franca Core.

References

Bibliography

 
 
 
 
 
 
 
 
 
 
 
 

English-language education
Forms of English
English phonology
English as a global language
English as a second or foreign language
Interlinguistics